The Chesterton Review is the peer-reviewed academic journal of the G. K. Chesterton Institute for Faith & Culture (Seton Hall University). It was established in 1974 to promote an interest in all aspects of G. K. Chesterton's life, work, art, and ideas, including his Christian apologetics. The journal includes essays and articles written by Chesterton, and occasionally publishes special issues on particular topics. It also publishes special editions in Spanish, Portuguese, French, and Italian. The editor-in-chief is Ian Boyd. The journal is available in both print and electronic formats from the Philosophy Documentation Center.

Abstracting and indexing 
The Chesterton Review is abstracted and indexed in the ATLA Religion Database and MLA International Bibliography.

Editions in other languages 
 The Chesterton Review en Español, established 2006
 The Chesterton Review em Português, established 2009
 The Chesterton Review en Français, established 2010
 The Chesterton Review in Italiano, established 2011

References

External links
 
 G.K. Chesterton Institute for Faith & Culture

Multilingual journals
G. K. Chesterton
Quarterly journals
Publications established in 1974
Christianity studies journals
Christian apologetics
Philosophy Documentation Center academic journals